Big Game is the third studio album by the glam metal band White Lion. It was released on August 10, 1989, by Atlantic Records, reaching #19 on The Billboard 200 album chart, #28 in Canada and #47 In the UK. The album contains the MTV hits, "Little Fighter", "Radar Love" and "Cry for Freedom". This album has a lighter sound than previous albums.

Overview
In the first half of 1989, still riding high on the multi platinum success of Pride, White Lion re-entered the studio following the completion of their Pride tour to record the next album, a decision the group later came to regret due to the effects of fatigue from the heavy touring. A musically eclectic follow-up to Pride, the album featured the single "Little Fighter", in Memory of The Rainbow Warrior, a Greenpeace boat which was intentionally sabotaged and sunk by the French Secret Service while docked in an Auckland harbour, New Zealand in 1985 and served as the inspiration for the Steven Seagal film On Deadly Ground. In 1989, a fundraising double album was released entitled "Greenpeace Rainbow Warriors".  
A cover of Golden Earring's "Radar Love" was released as the second single, followed by "Cry for Freedom" a political song about apartheid in South Africa and was one of many songs from the band that addressed social or political issues such as uprising to oppression. "Goin' Home Tonight" was also released as a single.

All of the singles featured music videos and the album quickly went gold, peaking at #19 on the US album charts and charting very well around the world. Following the album's release the band continued touring.

Track listing

Rock Candy reissue Bonus Tracks

HNE Recordings 2020 box set bonus tracks

Band members
 Mike Tramp – lead vocals, rhythm guitar
 Vito Bratta – lead guitar, backing vocals
 James LoMenzo – bass, backing vocals
 Greg D'Angelo – drums

Charts

Album

Year-end charts

Singles

Certifications

References

External links
 Official White Lion Website
 Official Mike Tramp Website

1989 albums
White Lion albums
Atlantic Records albums
Albums produced by Michael Wagener